Franco Lionel Godoy Milessi (born 28 June 2000) is an Argentine footballer who plays as a centre-back for Ferro Carril Oeste, on loan from Unión de Santa Fe.

Professional career
On 20 July 2018, Godoy signed his first professional contract with Unión de Santa Fe. Godoy made his debut with Unión in a 4-1 Argentine Primera División loss to Arsenal de Sarandí on 14 September 2019.

References

External links
 
 

2000 births
Living people
Sportspeople from Buenos Aires Province
Argentine footballers
Association football defenders
Unión de Santa Fe footballers
Independiente Rivadavia footballers
Ferro Carril Oeste footballers
Argentine Primera División players